Events from the year 1981 in the United Kingdom.

Incumbents
Monarch – Elizabeth II
Prime Minister – Margaret Thatcher (Conservative)
Parliament – 48th

Events

January
 3 January – Princess Alice, Countess of Athlone, daughter of Prince Leopold, Duke of Albany, and last surviving grandchild of Queen Victoria, dies at Kensington Palace aged 97.
 4 January – British Leyland workers vote to accept a peace formula in the Longbridge plant strike.
 5 January
 Peter Sutcliffe, a 34-year-old lorry driver from Bradford arrested on 2 January in Sheffield, is charged with being the notorious serial killer known as the "Yorkshire Ripper", who is believed to have murdered thirteen women and attacked seven others across northern England since 1975.
 BBC Two's The Hitchhiker's Guide to the Galaxy television adaptation begins airing; it subsequently receives a Royal Television Society award as "Most Original Programme" of the year.
 Cabinet reshuffle: Norman St John-Stevas and Angus Maude leave the Cabinet while Leon Brittan and Norman Fowler join the Cabinet.
 7 January – A parcel bomb addressed to the Prime Minister is intercepted at the sorting office.
 8 January
 A terrorist bomb attack takes place on the RAF base at Uxbridge
 The report of the Royal Commission on criminal procedure is published.
 9 January – The funeral of Princess Alice, Countess of Athlone, takes place at St George's Chapel, Windsor Castle, before her burial at Frogmore.
 13 January – The prison officers' overtime ban ends.
 14 January – The British Nationality Bill is published.
 15 January – Two soldiers are found guilty of murder in Northern Ireland.
 16 January
 Northern Ireland civil rights campaigner and former Westminster MP Bernadette McAliskey is shot at her home in County Tyrone.
 Inflation has fallen to 16.1%.
 78% of British Steel Corporation workers vote in favour of the chairman's "survival" plan.
 18 January – Ten people are killed in the New Cross house fire. On 25 January, another victim dies in hospital.
 21 January
 Sir Norman Stronge and his son, both former Stormont MPs, are killed by the Provisional Irish Republican Army (IRA).
 Two divers trapped below the North Sea are brought to safety to the surface.
 22 January – Australian newspaper owner Rupert Murdoch agrees to buy The Times provided an agreement can be reached with the unions.
 24 January – A Labour Party conference at Wembley votes for election of the party leader by electoral college with 40% votes for unions, 30% Labour MPs and 30% constituencies.
 25 January – The Limehouse Declaration: four right-wing Labour MPs, Shirley Williams, Roy Jenkins, Bill Rodgers and David Owen (the "Gang of Four"), announce plans to form a separate political party – the Social Democratic Party (SDP). On 26 January, nine more Labour MPs declare their support for the new party.
 26 January – Sir Keith Joseph, Secretary of State for Industry, announces further financial support for British Leyland.
 27 January – Bill Rodgers resigns from the Shadow Cabinet following his defection to the newly formed SDP. He is replaced by Tony Benn.
 28 January
 Sir Hugh Fraser is removed as Chairman of the House of Fraser.
 Fresh damage is caused in cells at HM Prison Maze in Northern Ireland.
 29 January – The UK Government welcomes plans by the Japanese car firm Nissan to build Datsun cars in Britain.
 30 January – David Owen tells his constituency party that he will not stand again as Labour candidate.

February
 2 February – The report on the Brixton prison escape is released and the Governor is transferred to an administrative post.
 4 February – Margaret Thatcher announces that the Government will sell half of its shares in British Aerospace.
 5 February – Actor Lord Olivier, cancer researcher Sir Peter Medawar and humanitarian Leonard Cheshire are admitted into the Order of Merit as announced in the New Year Honours list.
 6 February
 The Liverpool-registered coal ship Nellie M is bombed and sunk by an IRA unit driving a hijacked pilot boat in Lough Foyle.
 The Government drops two controversial clauses of the Nationality Bill.
 The Canadian Minister warns British MPs against delaying changes in the Canadian constitution.
 9 February – Shirley Williams resigns from Labour's national executive committee.
 11 February – Closure of the Talbot car plant in Linwood, Scotland, is announced.
 12 February
 Purchase of The Times and The Sunday Times from The Thomson Corporation by Rupert Murdoch's News International is confirmed. Murdoch also announces that an agreement with the unions has been reached about manning levels and new technology.
 Ian Paisley is suspended from the House of Commons for four days after calling the Northern Ireland Secretary a liar.
 The National Union of Students calls off a 5-week strike.
 13 February – The National Coal Board announces widespread pit closures.
 15 February – The first Sunday games of the Football League take place.
 16 February – Two are jailed in connection with the death of industrialist Thomas Niedermayer.
 17 February – Princess Anne is elected Chancellor of London University.
 18 February
 The Government withdraws plans to close 23 mines after negotiations with the National Union of Mineworkers.
 Harold Evans is appointed editor of The Times
 20 February
 Four more MPs announce their intention to leave the Labour Party.
 Peter Sutcliffe is charged with the murder of thirteen women in the north of England.
 21 February – 30,000 people march in an unemployment protest in Glasgow.
 24 February – The engagement of the 32-year-old Prince of Wales (now Charles III), and 19-year-old Lady Diana Spencer is officially announced.
 25 February
 Margaret Thatcher arrives in Washington, D.C. for a four-day visit to U.S. President Ronald Reagan.
 The Observer is taken over by "Tiny" Rowland, head of Lonrho.
 26 February
 The English cricket team withdraws from the Second Test after the Guyanese government serves a deportation order on Robin Jackman.
 Margaret Thatcher and Ronald Reagan met in Washington – El Salvador dominated the first day of their talks.
 27 February
 Three British missionaries released from Iran land in Athens.
 Sir Harold Wilson, former Prime Minister (1964–70, 1974–76) announces his retirement from Parliament at the next general election.
 The Archbishop of Canterbury advises the church to see homosexuality as a handicap not a sin.
 The Observer takeover is referred to the Monopolies Commission.

March
 3 March – Homebase opens its first DIY and garden centre superstore, at Croydon, Surrey.
 5 March – The ZX81, a pioneering British home computer, is launched by Sinclair Research, going on to sell over 1.5 million units worldwide.
 9 March
 John Lambe, a 37-year-old lorry driver, is sentenced to life imprisonment for the rape of twelve women in the space of less than four years.
 Thousands of civil servants hold a one-day strike over pay.
 17 March – The Conservative Government's budget is met with uproar due to further public spending cuts.
 21 March
 Home Secretary William Whitelaw allows Wolverhampton council to place a fourteen-day ban on political marches in the West Midlands town, which has a growing problem of militant race riots and was faced with the threat of a National Front march in two days time.
 After seven years and the longest time playing the title role, Tom Baker leaves Doctor Who and is replaced by Peter Davison in the final episode of Logopolis.
 Unemployment now stands at 2,400,000 or 10% of the workforce.
 Motorcycle racer Mike Hailwood, known as 'Mike the Bike' and fourteen times winner of the Isle of Man TT, is seriously injured in a car crash at Tanworth-in-Arden in Warwickshire; he dies of his injuries two days later.
 22 March – It is reported that a minority of Conservative MPs are planning to challenge the leadership of Margaret Thatcher in an attempt to reverse the party's declining popularity and fight off the challenge from Labour and the SDP.
 23 March – The Government imposes a ban on animal transportation on the Isle of Wight and southern Hampshire after an outbreak of foot and mouth disease in cattle.
 24 March – Barbados police rescue Great Train Robber Ronnie Biggs after his kidnapping in Brazil.
 26 March – Social Democratic Party formed by the so-called "Gang of Four": Shirley Williams, Bill Rodgers, Roy Jenkins, and David Owen, who have all defected from the Labour Party.
 28 March – Enoch Powell, Ulster Unionist MP (formerly a Conservative until 1974) warns of "racial civil war" in Britain.
 29 March – The first London Marathon is held.
 30 March – Academy Award-winning film Chariots of Fire released.

April
 2 April – The effects of the recession continue to claim jobs as Midland Red, the iconic Birmingham-based bus operator, closes down its headquarters in the city with the loss of some 170 jobs.
 4 April
 Bucks Fizz representing the United Kingdom win the Eurovision Song Contest with the song Making Your Mind Up.
 Susan Brown, a 23-year-old Biology student at Oxford University, becomes the first female cox in a winning Boat Race crew.
 Bob Champion, a 32-year-old cancer survivor, is the popular winner of the Grand National with his horse Aldaniti.
 5 April – The 1981 UK Census is conducted.
 10 April – Bobby Sands, an IRA member on hunger strike in the Maze prison, Northern Ireland, is elected MP for Fermanagh and South Tyrone in a by election.
 11 April – More than 300 people (most of them police officers) are injured and extensive damage is caused to property in the Brixton riot.
 13 April
 Home Secretary William Whitelaw announces a public inquiry, to be conducted by Lord Scarman, into the disturbances in Brixton.
 Enoch Powell warns that Britain "has seen nothing yet" with regards to racial unrest.
 Further rioting breaks out in Brixton.
 20 April
 23-year-old Steve Davis wins the World Snooker Championship for the first time.
 More than 100 people are arrested and 15 police officers are injured in clashes with black youths in the Finsbury Park, Forest Green and Ealing areas of London.
 21 April – The county administrative headquarters of Northumberland move from Newcastle upon Tyne to Morpeth.
 23 April – Unemployment passes the 2,500,000 mark for the first time in nearly 50 years.
 29 April – Peter Sutcliffe admits to the manslaughter of 13 women on the grounds of diminished responsibility, but the judge rules that a jury should rule on Sutcliffe's state of mind before deciding whether to accept his plea or find him guilty of murder.

May
 May – Peugeot closes the Talbot car plant at Linwood, Scotland which was opened by the Rootes Group 18 years ago as Scotland's only car factory. The closure of the factory also results in the end of the last remaining Rootes-developed product, the Avenger, after 11 years, as well as the four-year-old Sunbeam supermini. There are no plans to replace the Avenger, but a French-built small car based on the Peugeot 104 will replace the Sunbeam in the next few months.
 5 May
 Bobby Sands, a 27-year-old republican, dies in Northern Ireland's Maze Prison after a 66-day hunger strike.
 The trial of Peter Sutcliffe begins at the Old Bailey; he stands charged with 13 murders and seven attempted murders dating back to 1975.
 7 May – Ken Livingstone becomes leader of the GLC after Labour wins the GLC elections.
 9 May – The 100th FA Cup final ends with a 1–1 draw between Manchester City and Tottenham Hotspur at Wembley Stadium.
 11 May – The first performance of the Andrew Lloyd Webber musical Cats takes place at the New London Theatre.
 12 May – Francis Hughes (aged 25) becomes the second IRA hunger striker to die in Northern Ireland.
 13 May – An inquest returns an open verdict on the thirteen people who died as a result of their injuries in the New Cross fire.
 14 May – Tottenham Hotspur win the FA Cup for the sixth time in their history with a 3–2 win over Manchester City in the final replay at Wembley.
 15 May
 The inquiry into the Brixton riots opens.
 the Queen's second grandchild, a girl, is born to The Princess Anne and her husband Capt Mark Phillips.
 19 May – Peter Sutcliffe is found guilty of being the Yorkshire Ripper after admitting 13 charges of murder and a further seven of attempted murder. He will be sentenced later this week.
 21 May – The IRA hunger strike death toll reaches four with the deaths of Raymond McCreesh and Patrick O'Hara.
 22 May – Peter Sutcliffe is sentenced to life imprisonment with a recommendation that he should serve at least 30 years before parole can be considered.
 27 May – Liverpool F.C. win the European Cup for the third time by defeating Real Madrid of Spain 1–0 in the final at Parc des Princes, Paris, France. Alan Kennedy scores the only goal of the game. Although they have yet to equal Spanish side Real Madrid's record of six European Cups, they are the first British side to win the trophy three times.
 30 May – More than 100,000 people from across Britain march to Trafalgar Square in London for the TUC's March For Jobs.

June
 3 June – Shergar wins the Epsom Derby.
 9 June – King Khaled of Saudi Arabia arrives in Britain on a state visit.
 11 June
The NatWest Tower (later known as Tower 42) is formally opened by the Queen.
Britain's first Urban Enterprise Zone is created in Lower Swansea Valley, Wales.
 13 June – Marcus Sarjeant fires six blank cartridges at the Queen as she enters Horse Guards Parade.
 13–14 June – More than 80 arrests are made during clashes between white power skinheads and black people in Coventry, where the National Front is planning a march later this month, on the same day as an anti-racist concert by The Specials.
 15 June – Lord Scarman opens an enquiry into the Brixton riots.
 16 June – Liberal Party and SDP form an electoral pact – the SDP-Liberal Alliance.
 20 June
 Rioting breaks out in Peckham, South London.
 HMS Ark Royal is launched.
 21 June – A fire at Goodge Street tube station kills one person and injures 16.
 23 June – Unemployment reaches 2,680,977 (one in nine of the workforce), and Margaret Thatcher is warned that a further rise is likely.
 24 June – The twelfth James Bond film – For Your Eyes Only – is released in UK cinemas. It is the fifth of seven films to star Roger Moore as James Bond and the final Bond film to be solely distributed by United Artists.

July
 2 July – Four members of an Asian Muslim family (three of them children) are killed by arson at their home in Walthamstow, London; the attack is believed to have been racially motivated.
 3 July – Hundreds of Asians and skinheads riot in Southall, London, following disturbances at the Hamborough Tavern public house, which is severely damaged by fire.
 5 July – Toxteth riots break out in Liverpool and first use is made of CS gas by British police. Less serious riots occur in the Handsworth district of Birmingham as well as Wolverhampton city centre, parts of Coventry, Leicester and Derby, and also in the Buckinghamshire town High Wycombe.
 7 July – 43 people are charged with theft and violent disorder following a riot in Wood Green, North London.
 8 July
 Joe McDonnell becomes the fifth IRA hunger striker to die.
 Inner-city rioting continues when a riot in Moss Side, Manchester, sees more than 1,000 people besiege the local police station. However, the worst rioting in Toxteth has now ended.
 British Leyland ends production of the Austin Maxi, one of its longest-running cars, after 12 years.
 9 July – Rioting breaks out in Woolwich, London.
 10 July
 Rioting breaks out in London, Birmingham, Leeds, Leicester, Ellesmere Port, Luton, Sheffield, Portsmouth, Preston, Newcastle-upon-Tyne, Derby, Southampton, Nottingham, High Wycombe, Bedford, Edinburgh, Wolverhampton, Stockport, Blackburn, Huddersfield, Reading, Chester and Aldershot.
 Two days of rioting in Moss Side, Manchester, draw to a close, during which there has been extensive looting of shops. Princess Road, the main road through the area, will be closed for several days while adjacent buildings and gas mains damaged by rioting and arson are made safe.
 11 July – A further wave of rioting breaks out in Bradford, West Yorkshire.
 13 July
 The IRA hunger strike death toll reaches six when Martin Hurson dies.
 Margaret Thatcher announces that police will be able to use rubber bullets, water cannons and armoured vehicles against urban rioters. Labour leader Michael Foot blames the recent wave of rioting on the Conservative government's economic policies, which have seen unemployment rise by more than 70% in the last two years.
 15 July – Police clash with black youths in Brixton once again, this time after police raid properties in search of petrol bombs which are never found.
 16 July – Labour narrowly hang on to the Warrington seat in a by-election, fighting off a strong challenge from Roy Jenkins for the Social Democratic Party.
 17 July – Official opening of the Humber Bridge by the Queen.
 20 July – Michael Heseltine tours Merseyside to examine the problems in the area, which has been particularly badly hit by the current recession.
 25 July – Around 1,000 motorcyclists clash with police in Keswick, Cumbria.
 27 July
 British Telecommunications Act separates British Telecom from the Royal Mail with effect from 1 October.
 The two-month-old daughter of The Princess Anne and her husband Capt Mark Phillips is christened Zara Anne Elizabeth.
 28 July – Margaret Thatcher blames IRA leaders for the recent IRA hunger striker deaths.
 29 July – The wedding of Prince Charles and Lady Diana Spencer takes place at St Paul's Cathedral. More than 30 million viewers watch the wedding on television – the second highest television audience of all time in Britain.

August
 Unknown date – Japanese carmaker Suzuki follows up the British success of its motorcycles by importing passenger cars to Britain for the first time, with first imported model being the Suzuki Alto, a small hatchback available with three or five doors and marketed as a competitor for the Mini and Citroen 2CV.
 1 August – Kevin Lynch becomes the seventh IRA hunger striker to die.
 2 August – Within 24 hours of Kevin Lynch's death, Kieran Doherty becomes the eighth IRA hunger striker to die.
 8 August – The IRA hunger strike claims its ninth hunger striker so far (and its third in a week) with the death of Thomas McElwee.
 9 August – Broadmoor Hospital falls under heavy criticism after the escape of a second prisoner in three weeks. The latest absconder is 32-year-old Alan Reeve, a convicted double murderer.
 17 August – An inquiry opens in the Moss Side riots.
 20 August
 The tenth IRA hunger striker, Michael Devine, dies in prison.
 Inflation has fallen to 10.9% – the lowest under this government.
 Minimum Lending Rate ceases to be set by the Bank of England.
 24 August – Mark David Chapman is sentenced to 20 years to life in prison for killing John Lennon.
 25 August – Britain's largest Enterprise Zone is launched on deindustrialised land on Tyneside.
 26 August – Vauxhall launches the second generation Cavalier, built on General Motors J-Car platform, available for the first time with front-wheel drive and a hatchback.
 27 August – Moira Stuart, 31, is appointed the BBC's first black newsreader.

September
 September – Little Miss Bossy, the first book in the Little Miss series (of the female versions of Mr. Men) is first published.
 1 September – Filling stations start selling motor fuel by the litre.
 8 September
 Greenham Common Women's Peace Camp set up by women who have walked from Cardiff to RAF Greenham Common to protest at plans to site US nuclear missiles there.
 Sixteen Islington Labour councillors join the SDP following the defection of Labour MP Michael O'Halloran.
 The first episode of the long-running and iconic sitcom Only Fools and Horses is broadcast on BBC1. 
 10 September – Another Enterprise Zone is launched, the latest being in Wakefield, West Yorkshire.
 14 September – Cecil Parkinson is appointed chairman of the Conservative Party.
 16 September – The children's series Postman Pat is first broadcast on BBC1. 
 17 September – A team of divers begins removing gold ingots worth £40 million from the wreck of HMS Edinburgh, sunk off the coast of Norway in 1942.
 18 September – David Steel tells delegates at the Liberal Party conference to "go back to your constituencies and prepare for government", hopes of which are boosted by the fact that most opinion polls now show the SDP-Liberal Alliance in the lead.
 21 September – Belize is granted independence
 23 September – Vauxhall launch their successful replacement for the Cavalier Mk1 the Cavalier Mk2.
 25 September – Ford announces that its best-selling Cortina will be discontinued next year and its replacement will be called the Sierra.
 29 September – Football mourns the legendary former Liverpool manager Bill Shankly, who dies that day at the age of 68 after suffering a heart attack.

October
 1 October – Bryan Robson, 24-year-old midfielder, becomes Britain's most expensive footballer in a £1.5million move from West Bromwich Albion to Manchester United.
 3 October – Hunger strikes at the Maze Prison in Northern Ireland end after seven months. The final six hunger strikers have been without food for between 13 and 55 days.
 5 October – Depeche Mode release their début album Speak and Spell.
 7 October – British Leyland launches the Triumph Acclaim, a four-door small family saloon built in collaboration with Japanese car and motorcycle giant Honda at the Cowley plant in Oxford. It is based on the Japanese Honda Ballade (not available in Britain), has front-wheel drive, is powered by a 1.3-litre 70 bhp petrol engine and is between the Ford Escort and Ford Cortina in terms of size.
 10 October – Chelsea Barracks bombed by the Provisional Irish Republican Army, killing two people.
 12 October – British Leyland announces the closure of three factories – a move which will cost nearly 3,000 people their jobs.
 12 October – 22 December – Original run of Granada Television serial Brideshead Revisited.
 13 October – Opinion polls show that Margaret Thatcher is still unpopular as Conservative leader due to her anti-inflationary economic measures, which have now come under fire from her predecessor Edward Heath.
 15 October – Norman Tebbit tells fellow Conservative MPs: "I grew up in the thirties with an unemployed father. He didn't riot. He got on his bike and looked for work and he kept looking until he found it".
 19 October – British Telecom announces that the telegram will be discontinued next year after 139 years in use.
 22 October – The case of Dudgeon v United Kingdom is decided by the European Court of Human Rights, which rules that the continued existence of laws in Northern Ireland criminalising consensual gay sex is in contravention of the European Convention on Human Rights.
 23 October – The Liberal-SDP Alliance tops a MORI poll on 40%, putting them ahead of Labour on 31% and the Conservatives on 27%.
 24 October – CND anti-nuclear march in London attracts over 250,000 people.
 26 October – Rock band Queen release their Greatest Hits compilation album; it becomes the all-time best-selling album in the United Kingdom.
 29 October  –  A patient dies of pneumocystis pneumonia at the Royal Brompton Hospital, London. He is the first person (patient zero) in the UK to die of an AIDS related illness. An investigation by ITN in 2021 will identify him as John Eaddie of Bournemouth.
30 October – Nicholas Reed, chief of the Euthanasia charity Exit, is jailed for two-and-a-half years for aiding and abetting suicides.

November
 1 November – British Leyland's 58,000-strong workforce begins a strike over pay.
 2 November – The TV licence increases in price from £34 to £46 for a colour TV, and £12 to £15 for black and white.
 13 November – The Queen opens the final phase of the Telford Shopping Centre, nearly a decade after development began on the first phase of what is now one of the largest indoor shopping centres in Europe in the Shropshire new town.
 16 November – Production of the Vauxhall Astra commences in Britain at the Ellesmere Port plant in Cheshire. The Astra was launched a year ago but until now has been produced solely at the Opel plant in West Germany.
 18 November – The England national football team beats Hungary 1–0 at Wembley Stadium to qualify for the World Cup in Spain next summer, with the only goal being scored by Ipswich Town striker Paul Mariner It is the first time they have qualified for the tournament since 1970.
 23 November – 1981 United Kingdom tornado outbreak, the largest recorded tornado outbreak in European history.
 25 November – A report into the Brixton Riots, which scarred inner-city London earlier this year, points the finger of blame at the social and economic problems which have been plaguing Brixton and many other inner-city areas across England.
 26 November – Shirley Williams wins the Crosby by-election for the SDP, overturning a Conservative majority of nearly 20,000 votes.

December
 8 December
 Severe snow storms hit the UK as temperatures plummet to the lowest in any December on record since 1874 and the heaviest snow falls since 1878. The snow storms continue in waves until 26/27 December.
Arthur Scargill becomes leader of the National Union of Mineworkers.
 9 December – Michael Heseltine announces a £95 million aid package for the inner cities.
 11 December – Seer Green rail crash: a train crash in Seer Green near Gerrards Cross, Buckinghamshire kills four people and seriously injures five others. The crash was caused by a combination of the severe blizzards and human error.
 12 December – The first case of AIDS in the UK is diagnosed.
 19 December – An opinion poll shows that Margaret Thatcher is now the most unpopular postwar British prime minister and that the SDP-Liberal Alliance has the support of up to 50% of the electorate.
 20 December – Penlee lifeboat disaster: The crew of the MV Union Star and the life-boat Solomon Browne sent to rescue them are all killed in heavy seas off Cornwall; some of the bodies are never found.

Undated
 Inflation has fallen to 11.9%, the second lowest annual level since 1973, but has been largely achieved by the mass closure of heavy industry facilities that have contributed to the highest postwar levels of unemployment.
 In spite of the continuing rise in employment, the British economy improves from 4% contraction last year to 0.8% overall growth this year.
 First Urban Development Corporations set up in London Docklands and Merseyside.
 First purpose-built Hindu temple in the British Isles formally opens in Slough.
 The London department store Whiteleys closes, after 107 years in business.
 Last manufacture of coal gas, at Millport, Isle of Cumbrae.
 Perrier Comedy Awards first presented to the best shows on the Edinburgh Festival Fringe.
 Suzuki, the Japanese manufacturer famous for producing motorcycles, imports passenger cars to the United Kingdom for the first time. The first model sold in Britain is the entry-level Alto, with the SJ four-wheel drive set to go on sale in 1982.
 In spite of the continued rise in unemployment, the British economy improved with 1.8% overall growth for the year compared to 3% overall contraction in 1980.
 New car sales in the United Kingdom fall to just over 1.4 million. The Ford Cortina enjoys its 10th year as Britain's best-selling car since 1967, while the new front-wheel drive Ford Escort is close behind in second place. British Leyland's new Metro is Britain's fourth most popular new car with nearly 100,000 sales. The Datsun Cherry, eighth in the sales charts, is the most popular foreign car in Britain this year.

Publications
 Alasdair Gray's novel Lanark: A Life in Four Books.
 Terry Pratchett's novel Strata.
 Salman Rushdie's novel Midnight's Children.
 D. M. Thomas' novel The White Hotel.

Births
 6 January – Andrew Britton, novelist (died 2008)
 11 January 
 Jamelia, singer
 Tom Meighan, singer and songwriter
 19 January – Thaila Zucchi, singer and actress
 22 January 
 Richard Butcher, footballer (died 2011)
 Guy Wilks, rally driver
 25 January – Alex Partridge, rower
 29 January – Rachna Khatau, actress
 30 January – Peter Crouch, footballer
 31 January – Gemma Collins, media personality and businesswoman
 1 February – Rob Austin, racing driver
 8 February – Ralf Little, actor and footballer
 9 February – Tom Hiddleston, actor
 10 February – Holly Willoughby, television presenter
 16 February – Alison Rowatt, Scottish field hockey midfielder
 17 February – Andrew Stephenson, politician
 27 March – Terry McFlynn, Northern Irish footballer
 1 April – Hannah Spearritt, pop singer (S Club 7) and actress
 3 April – Arfius Arf, artist 
 10 April – Liz McClarnon, pop singer (Atomic Kitten)
 23 April – Gemma Whelan, actress and comedian
 25 April – John McFall, paralympic sprinter
 3 May – Charlie Brooks, actress
 5 May – Craig David, singer
 13 May – Luciana Berger, Labour Member of Parliament
 15 May – Zara Phillips, equestrienne, daughter of Anne, Princess Royal
 16 May
 Joseph Morgan, actor
 Jim Sturgess, actor
 17 May – Leon Osman, footballer
 20 May – Sean Conlon, musician (5ive)
 22 May – Sara Pascoe, writer and comedian
 29 May – Rochelle Clark, English rugby union player
 9 June
 Helen Don-Duncan, English backstroke swimmer
 Alex Neil, Scottish football player and manager
 Anoushka Shankar, sitar player
 11 June – Alistair McGregor, Scottish field hockey goalkeeper
 23 June – Antony Costa, singer 
 25 June – Sheridan Smith, actress 
 27 June – Sam Hoare, actor and director
 28 June – Joanne Ellis, field hockey midfielder
 30 June – Tom Burke, actor
 9 July – Jamie Thomas King, actor
 14 July – Lee Mead, actor and singer
 8 August – Bradley McIntosh, pop singer (S Club 7)
 11 August – Sandi Thom, Scottish singer & songwriter
 17 August 
 Johnny Mercer, army officer and Conservative Member of Parliament
 Chris New, actor
 20 August – Ben Barnes, actor (Prince Caspian)
 28 August – Kezia Dugdale, Scottish Labour leader
 2 September – Chris Tremlett, cricketer
 3 September – Fearne Cotton, television presenter 
 7 September – Natalie McGarry, SNP Member of Parliament convicted of embezzlement
 11 September – Mark Rhodes, singer, runner up from Pop Idol (series 2) and TV host
 15 September – Richard Alexander, English field hockey defender
 16 September – David Mitchell, Scottish field hockey defender
 21 September – Sarah Whatmore, English singer-songwriter
 23 September – Helen Richardson, field hockey defender
 29 September – Suzanne Shaw, actress and singer (Hear'Say)
 1 October – Deborah James, journalist and cancer campaigner (died 2022)
 9 October – Rupert Friend, actor, producer and screenwriter
 10 October – Stinson Hunter, filmmaker and journalist 
 13 October
Ryan Ashford, footballer
Kele Okereke, singer and guitarist (Bloc Party)
 25 October – Shaun Wright-Phillips, footballer
 31 October – Kate Granger, physician and fundraiser (died 2016)
 7 November – George Pilkington, footballer
 13 November – Tom Ferrier, racing driver
 15 November – Jared O'Mara, politician and fraudster
 17 November – Sarah Harding, pop singer (Girls Aloud) (died 2021)
 20 November 
 Scott Hutchison, Scottish singer, songwriter and guitarist (died 2018)
 Andrea Riseborough, actress
 26 November – Natasha Bedingfield, singer
 27 November – Gary Lucy, actor and model
 29 November – Tom Hurndall, photographer (died 2004)
 30 November – Lisa Head, soldier (died 2011)
 1 December – Kathryn Drysdale, actress
 15 December
 Michelle Dockery, actress
 Victoria Summer, actress
 21 December – Sajid Mahmood, English cricketer
 28 December – Frank Turner, punk and folk singer-songwriter
 29 December – Charlotte Riley, actress 
 Undated – Sunjeev Sahota, novelist

Deaths
 3 January – Princess Alice, Countess of Athlone, member of the royal family (born 1883)
 6 January – A. J. Cronin, Scottish novelist (born 1896)
 11 February – Franz Sondheimer, German-born British-Israeli chemist (born 1926)
 6 March – George Geary, English cricketer (born 1893)
 11 March – Sir Maurice Oldfield, intelligence chief (born 1915)
 23 March
 Sir Claude Auchinleck, field marshal (born 1884; died in Morocco)
 Mike Hailwood, motorcycle racer (car crash) (born 1940)
 29 March – Clive Sansom, British-born Australian poet (born 1910)
 31 March – Enid Bagnold, author and playwright (born 1889)
 16 April – George Cambridge, 2nd Marquess of Cambridge, member of the royal family (born 1895)
 5 May – Bobby Sands, volunteer in the Provisional Irish Republican Army and member of parliament (born 1954; died in 1981 Irish hunger strike)
 9 May – Ralph Allen, footballer (born 1906)
 28 May – John Bryan Ward-Perkins, archaeologist (born 1912)
 17 June – General Sir Richard O'Connor, soldier (born 1889)
 26 August – Peter Eckersley, television producer (born 1936)
 7 September – Kathleen Guthrie, artist (born 1905)
 8 September – Bill Shankly, Scottish-born football manager (born 1913)
 11 September – Harold Bennett, actor (born 1898)
 14 September – Mary Potter, painter (born 1900)
 23 September – Sam Costa, crooner, radio actor and disc jockey (born 1910)
 27 September – Sir Stanley Davidson, physician (born 1894)
 12 October – Robert McKenzie, political analyst (born 1917)
 26 October – Kenneth Howorth, Metropolitan Police officer (killed by IRA bomb) (born 1932)
 22 November – Sir Hans Adolf Krebs, German-born British physician and biochemist and Nobel laureate (born 1900)

See also
 List of British films of 1981

References

 
Years of the 20th century in the United Kingdom
United Kingdom